The 2005 Cork Junior A Hurling Championship was the 108th staging of the Cork Junior A Hurling Championship since its establishment by the Cork County Board in 1895. The championship began on 24 September 2005 and 19 November 2005.

On 19 November 2005, Fr. O'Neill's won the championship following a 0-15 to 1-9 defeat of Kilworth in the final. This was their first championship title in the grade.

Kilworth's Paudie Lynch was the championship's top scorer with 1-20.

Qualification

Results

First round

Semi-finals

Final

Championship statistics

Top scorers

Overall

In a single game

References

Cork Junior Hurling Championship
Cork Junior Hurling Championship